Irene Gabriel may refer to:

Irene Gabriel, character in Driver (2011 film)
Irene Gabriel, contestant in Miss World Philippines 2011